A Romance of Old Baghdad is a 1922 British silent drama film directed by Kenelm Foss and starring Matheson Lang, Manora Thew and Roy Travers. It is an adaptation of the novel Miss Haroun al Rashid by Jessie Douglas Kerruish. In nineteenth century Mesopotamia a series of romantic entanglements ensue. The Hollywood actress Evelyn Brent was originally intended to star but did not ultimately appear in the finished film.

Cast
 Matheson Lang as Prince Omar
 Manora Thew as Sourna
 Roy Travers as Harvey P. Wilbur
 Henry Victor as Horne Jerningham
 George Bellamy as General Walters
 Barbara Everest as Mrs Jocelyn
 A. Harding Steerman as Mr Jocelyn
 Douglas Munro as Abdul Bey
 Clyne Dacia as Rathia
 George Foley as Kadi
 Rolf Leslie as Haji
 Victor McLaglen as Miski
 Jack Minister as Piers Blessington
 Lorna Rathbone as Evelyn Jerningham
 Beatie Olna Travers as Salti

References

Bibliography
 Kear, Lynn & King, James. Evelyn Brent: The Life and Films of Hollywood's Lady Crook. McFarland & Co, 2009.

External links
 

1922 films
1922 romantic drama films
1920s historical romance films
British romantic drama films
British silent feature films
Films based on British novels
Films directed by Kenelm Foss
Films set in Baghdad
British black-and-white films
British historical romance films
1920s British films
Silent romantic drama films
Silent historical romance films